Iveta Vacenovská (born 22 March 1986) is a Czech Table tennis player. She resides in Linz, Austria and plays for Linz AG Froschberg.

Based on her world ranking in May 2011, she qualified directly for the London 2012 Olympic Games, where she reached the third round before losing to Wu Jiaduo of Germany.

Life
Vacenovská began playing table tennis when she was six years old, because of her uncle, who is a table tennis coach. Besides being a professional athlete, she is also a student at the Charles University in Prague in the Department of Sport and Physical Education, and enjoys all kinds of sporting activities.

Career records
2003 European Youth Champion Singles
2006 U21 Winner ITTF Pro Tour Grand Finals
2009 3rd place Team European Championships
2009 Champions League Winner with Linz AG Froschberg
2005, 2007, 2011 Winner Stadtmeisterschaften Singles
2015 bronze medal in the 2015 European Games in table tennis.

References

1986 births
Living people
People from Hodonín
Czech female table tennis players
Olympic table tennis players of the Czech Republic
Table tennis players at the 2012 Summer Olympics
Table tennis players at the 2016 Summer Olympics
Table tennis players at the 2015 European Games
Universiade medalists in table tennis
Universiade bronze medalists for the Czech Republic
European Games medalists in table tennis
European Games bronze medalists for the Czech Republic
Sportspeople from the South Moravian Region
Charles University alumni